eKoduram Dalit (5 March 1910 - 28 September 1967) was an Indian poet in Hindi and Chhattisgarhi languages.

Ha Pradesh.

ukhaay are two of his popular poem collections.

Nawagarh (Bemetara, Chhattisgarh) is named after him - Koduram Dalit Mahavidyala.

References 

20th-century Indian poets
Poets from Chhattisgarh
1967 deaths
Indian male poets
Hindi-language poets
Poets from Madhya Pradesh
1910 births
20th-century Indian male writers